Gürgenli (literally "(place) with hornbeams") is a Turkish place name that may refer to the following places in Turkey:

 Gürgenli, Gerger, a village in the district of Gerger, Adıyaman Province
 Gürgenli, Sason, a village in the district of Sason, Batman Province